Human rights are moral principles or norms that describe certain standards of human behaviour.

Human Rights may also refer to individual birth right.

Human Rights (album), by Wadada Leo Smith
Human Rights (journal), a defunct American political magazine

See also
Civil rights (disambiguation)
Centre for Human Rights
Human Rights League (disambiguation)
Ministry of Human Rights (disambiguation)